Cause for Alarm is the second full-length studio album by New York hardcore band Agnostic Front. It was released in 1986 on Relativity/Combat Records and follows 1984's Victim in Pain. The album is still available on a split release with Victim in Pain on the same disc.

Overview 
The addition of a second guitarist Alex Kinon led to a more metallic approach, although the songs still had mostly a hardcore sound. One other line-up change was the replacement of Dave Jones by Louie Beatto on drums. The band would further explore the metal sound on their next album, 1987's Liberty and Justice For...

Controversy 
Several critics, including Phil Donahue, Jello Biafra and the fanzine Maximum Rocknroll, have criticized Agnostic Front for the controversial lyrics of the song "Public Assistance", written for the band by then-Carnivore frontman Peter Steele.  Steele went on to write a very similar song for his new band Type O Negative named Der Untermensch, which appeared on their album Slow Deep and Hard.

Critical reception

In 2005, Cause for Alarm was ranked number 302 in Rock Hard magazine's book of The 500 Greatest Rock & Metal Albums of All Time.

Track listing 

"Your Mistake" was covered by Fear Factory, with Freddy Cricien of Madball, on the Demanufacture digipak as a bonus track, and by Hatebreed on their album For the Lions.

Personnel
Agnostic Front
 Roger Miret – vocals
 Vinnie Stigma – lead guitar
 Alex Kinon – rhythm guitar
 Rob Kabula – bass
 Louie Beatto – drums

Production
 Recorded at Systems II, Brooklyn, New York
 Produced by Norman Dunn
 Engineered by Mike Maricano

References

External links 
 Flex! Discography album entry
 Discogs album entry
 

1986 albums
Agnostic Front albums
Combat Records albums